The Ghaznavid dynasty ( Ġaznaviyān) or the Ghaznavid Empire, was a culturally Persianate, Sunni Muslim dynasty and empire of Turkic mamluk origin, ruling at its greatest extent, large parts of Persia, Khorasan, much of Transoxiana and the northwest Indian subcontinent from 977 to 1186. The dynasty was founded by Sabuktigin upon his succession to the rule of Ghazna after the death of his father-in-law, Alp Tigin, who was an ex-general of the Samanid Empire from Balkh, north of the Hindu Kush in Greater Khorasan.

Sabuktigin's son, Mahmud of Ghazni, expanded the Ghaznavid Empire to the Amu Darya, the Indus River and the Indian Ocean in the east and to Rey and Hamadan in the west. Under the reign of Mas'ud I, the Ghaznavid dynasty began losing control over its western territories to the Seljuk Empire after the Battle of Dandanaqan in 1040, resulting in a restriction of its holdings to modern-day Afghanistan, Pakistan and Northern India. 

In 1151, Sultan Bahram Shah lost Ghazni to the Ghurid sultan Ala al-Din Husayn. The Ghaznavids retook Ghazni, but lost the city to the Ghuzz Turks who in turn lost it to Muhammad of Ghor. In response, the Ghaznavids fled to Lahore, their regional capital. In 1186, Lahore was conquered by the Ghurid sultan, Muhammad of Ghor, with its Ghaznavid ruler, Khusrau Malik, imprisoned and later executed.

Rise to power

Two military families arose from the Turkic slave-guards of the Samanid Empire, the Simjurids and Ghaznavids, who ultimately proved disastrous to the Samanids. The Simjurids received an appanage in the Kohistan region of eastern Khorasan. The Samanid generals Alp Tigin and Abu al-Hasan Simjuri competed for the governorship of Khorasan and control of the Samanid Empire by placing on the throne emirs they could dominate after the death of Abd al-Malik I in 961. His death created a succession crisis between his brothers.

A court party instigated by men of the scribal class – civilian ministers rather than Turkic generals – rejected the candidacy of Alp Tigin for the Samanid throne. Mansur I was installed instead, and Alp Tigin prudently retired to south of the Hindu Kush, where he captured Ghazna and became the ruler of the city as a Samanid authority. The Simjurids enjoyed control of Khorasan south of the Amu Darya but were hard-pressed by a third great Iranian dynasty, the Buyid dynasty, and were unable to survive the collapse of the Samanids and the subsequent rise of the Ghaznavids.

The struggles of the Turkic slave generals for mastery of the throne with the help of shifting allegiance from the court's ministerial leaders both demonstrated and accelerated the Samanid decline. Samanid weakness attracted into Transoxiana the Karluks, a Turkic people who had recently converted to Islam. They occupied Bukhara in 992, establishing in Transoxania the Kara-Khanid Khanate.

Alp Tigin's died in 963, and after two ghulam governors and three years, his slave Sabuktigin became the governor of Ghazna.

Domination

Sabuktigin

Sabuktigin lived as a mamluk, Turkic slave-soldier,{{efn|The Ghaznavids were a dynasty of Turkic slave-soldiers...}}  during his youth and later married the daughter of his master Alptigin, who fled to Ghazna (modern Ghazni Province in Afghanistan) following a failed coup attempt. After Alptigin death, his son Abu Ishaq Ibrahim governed Ghazna for three years. His death was followed by the reign of a former ghulam of Alptigin, Bilgetigin. Bilgetigin's rule was so harsh the populace invited Abu Bakr Lawik back. It was through Sabuktigin's military ability that Lawik was removed, Bilgetigin was exiled, and Sabuktigin gained the governorship. 

Once established as governor of Ghazna, Sabuktigin was asked to intervene in Khurasan, at the insistence of the Samanid emir, and after a victorious campaign received the governorships of Balkh, Tukharistan, Bamiyan, Ghur and Gharchistan. Sabuktigin inherited a governorship in turmoil. In Zabulistan, the typical military fief system(mustaghall) were being changed into permanent ownership(tamlik) which resulted in the Turkic soldiery unwilling to take up arms. Sabuktigin reformed the system making them all a mustaghall-type fief. In 976, he ended the conflict between two Turkic ghulams at Bust and restored the original ruler. Later that same year, Sabuktigin campaigned against Qusdar, catching the ruler(possibly Mu'tazz b. Ahmad) off guard and obtaining an annual tribute from him.

After the death of Sabuktigin, his son by Alptigin's daughter, Ismail, was given Ghazna. Another son, Abu'l-Muzaffar Nasr, was given the governorship of Bust, while in Khorasan, the eldest son Mahmud, was given command of the army. Sabuktigin's intent was to ensure governorships for his family, despite the decaying influence of the Samanid Empire, and did not consider his dynasty as independent. Ismail, upon gaining his inheritance, quickly traveled to Bust and did homage to Emir Abu'l-Harith Mansur b. Nuh. Mahmud, who had been left out of any significant inheritance, proposed a division of power, to which Ismail refused. Mahmud marched on Ghazna and subsequently Ismail was defeated and captured in 998 at the Battle of Ghazni.

Mahmud, son of Sabuktigin

In 998, Mahmud, son of Sebuktigin, succeeded to the governorship, and Ghazni and the Ghaznavid dynasty became perpetually associated with him. He emphasized his loyalty in a letter to the caliph, saying that the Samanids had only been replaced because of their treason. Mahmud received the governorship of Khurasan and titles of Yamin al-Dawla and Amin al-Milla. As a representative of caliphal authory, he championed Sunni Islam by campaigning against the Ismaili and Shi'ite Buyids. He completed the conquest of the Samanid and Shahi territories, including the Ismaili Kingdom of Multan, Sindh, as well as some Buwayhid territory.

By all accounts, the rule of Mahmud was the golden age and height of the Ghaznavid Empire. Mahmud carried out seventeen expeditions through northern India to establish his control and set up tributary states, and his raids also resulted in the looting of a great deal of plunder. He established his authority from the borders of Ray to Samarkand, from the Caspian Sea to the Yamuna.

During Mahmud's reign (997–1030), the Ghaznavids settled 4,000 Turkmen families near Farana in Khorasan. By 1027, due to the Turkmen raiding neighbouring settlements, the governor of Tus, Abu l'Alarith Arslan Jadhib, led military strikes against them. The Turkmen were defeated and scattered to neighbouring lands. Still, as late as 1033, Ghaznavid governor Tash Farrash executed fifty Turkmen chiefs for raids into Khorasan.

Indian conquests

Mahmud of Ghazni led incursions deep into India, as far as Mathura, Kannauj and Somnath. In 1001, he defeated the Hindu Shahi in the Battle of Peshawar. In 1004-5, he invaded the Principality of Bhatiya and in 1006 the neighbouring Emirate of Multan. In 1008-9, he again vanquished the Hindu Shahis at the Battle of Chach, and established Governors in the conquered areas. In India, the Ghaznavids were called Turushkas ("Turks") or Hammiras (from the Arabic Amir "Commander").

In 1018, he laid waste to the city of Mathura, which was "ruthlessly sacked, ravaged, desecrated and destroyed". According to Muhammad Qasim Hindu Shah, writing an "History of Hindustan" in the 16th-17th century, the city of Mathura was the richest in India. When it was attacked by Mahmud of Ghazni, "all the idols" were burnt and destroyed during a period of twenty days, gold and silver was smelted for booty, and the city was burnt down. In 1018 Mahmud also captured Kanauj, the capital of the Gurjara-Pratiharas, and then confronted the Chandelas, from whom he obtained the payment of tribute. In 1026, he raided and plundered the Somnath temple, taking away a booty of 20 million dinars.

The wealth brought back from Mahmud's Indian expeditions to Ghazni was enormous, and contemporary historians (e.g., Abolfazl Beyhaghi, Ferdowsi) give glowing descriptions of the magnificence of the capital and of the conqueror's munificent support of literature. Mahmud died in April 1030 and had chosen his son, Mohammed, as his successor.

Decline
Twin sons of Mahmud

Mahmud left the empire to his son Mohammed, who was mild, affectionate and soft. His brother, Mas'ud, asked for three provinces that he had won by his sword, but his brother did not consent. Mas'ud had to fight his brother, and he became king, blinding and imprisoning Mohammed as punishment. Mas'ud was unable to preserve the empire and following a disastrous defeat at the Battle of Dandanaqan in 1040, he lost all the Ghaznavid lands in Persia and Central Asia to the Seljuks, plunging the realm into a "time of troubles". His last act was to collect all his treasures from his forts in hope of assembling an army and ruling from India, but his own forces plundered the wealth and he proclaimed his blind brother as king again. The two brothers now exchanged positions: Mohammed was elevated from prison to the throne, while Mas'ud was consigned to a dungeon after a reign of ten years and was assassinated in 1040. Mas'ud's son, Madood, was governor of Balkh, and in 1040, after hearing of his father's death, he came to Ghazni to claim his kingdom. He fought with the sons of the blind Mohammed and was victorious. However, the empire soon disintegrated and most kings did not submit to Madood. In a span of nine years, four more kings claimed the throne of Ghazni.

Ibrahim

In 1058, Mas'ud's son Ibrahim, a great calligrapher who wrote the Koran with his own pen, became king. Ibrahim re-established a truncated empire on a firmer basis by arriving at a peace agreement with the Seljuks and a restoration of cultural and political linkages. Under Ibrahim and his successors the empire enjoyed a period of sustained tranquility. Shorn of its western land, it was increasingly sustained by riches accrued from raids across Northern India, where it faced stiff resistance from Indian rulers such as the Paramara of Malwa and the Gahadvala of Kannauj. He ruled until 1098.

Mas'ud III
Mas'ud III became king for sixteen years, with no major event in his lifetime. Mas'ud built the Palace of Sultan Mas'ud III and one of the Ghazni Minarets. Signs of weakness in the state became apparent when he died in 1115, with internal strife between his sons ending with the ascension of Sultan Bahram Shah as a Seljuk vassal. Bahram Shah defeated his brother Arslan for the throne at the Battle of Ghazni in 1117.

Sultan Bahram Shah
Sultan Bahram Shah was the last Ghaznavid King, ruling Ghazni, the first and main Ghaznavid capital, for thirty-five years. In 1148 he was defeated in Ghazni by Sayf al-Din Suri, but he recaptured the capital the next year. Ala al-Din Husayn, a Ghorid King, conquered the city in 1151, in revenge for his brother Kutubbuddin's death, who was son-in-law of the king but was publicly punished and killed for a minor offence. Ala al-Din Husayn then razed the city, burning it for 7 days, after which he became known as "Jahānsuz" (World Burner). Ghazni was restored to the Ghaznavids by the intervention of the Seljuks, who came to the aid of Bahram. Ghaznavid struggles with the Ghurids continued in subsequent years as they nibbled away at Ghaznavid territory, and Ghazni and Zabulistan were lost to a group of Oghuz Turks before being captured by the Ghurids. Ghazni fell to the Ghurids around 1170.

Late Ghaznavids

After the fall of Ghazni in 1163, the Ghaznavids established themselves in Lahore, their regional capital for Indian territories since its conquest by Mahmud of Ghazni, which became the new capital of the Late Ghaznavids. Ghaznavid power in northwestern India continued until the Ghurid conquest of Lahore by Muhammad of Ghor in 1186, deposing the last Ghaznavid ruler Khusrau Malik.  Both Khusrau Malik and his son were imprisoned and summarily executed in Firuzkuh in 1191, extinguishing the Ghaznavid lineage.

Military and tactics
The core of the Ghaznavid army was primarily made up of Turks, as well as thousands of native Afghans who were trained and assembled from the area south of the Hindu Kush in what is now Afghanistan. During the rule of Sultan Mahmud, a new, larger military training center was established in Bost (now Lashkar Gah). This area was known for blacksmiths where war weapons were made. After capturing and conquering the Punjab region, the Ghaznavids began to employ Hindus in their army.

Like the other dynasties that rose out of the remains of the Abbasid Caliphate, the Ghaznavid administrative traditions and military practice came from the Abbasids. The Arabian horses, at least in the earliest campaign, were still substantial in Ghaznavid military incursions, especially in dashing raids deep into hostile territory. There is a record of '6000 Arab horse' being sent against king Anandapala in 1008, and evidence of this Arabian cavalry persists until 1118 under the Ghaznavid governor in Lahore.

Due to their access to the Indus-Ganges plains, the Ghaznavids, during the 11th and 12th centuries, developed the first Muslim army to use war elephants in battle. The elephants were protected by armour plating on their fronts. The use of these elephants was a foreign weapon in other regions that the Ghaznavids fought in, particularly in Central Asia.

State and culture

Although the dynasty was of Central Asian Turkic origin, it was thoroughly Persianised in terms of language, culture, literature and habits and has been regarded as a "Persian dynasty".

According to Clifford Edmund Bosworth:

Persian literary culture enjoyed a renaissance under the Ghaznavids during the 11th century. The Ghaznavid court was so renowned for its support of Persian literature that the poet Farrukhi traveled from his home province to work for them. The poet Unsuri's short collection of poetry was dedicated to Sultan Mahmud and his brothers Nasr and Yaqub. Another poet of the Ghaznavid court, Manuchehri, wrote numerous poems about the merits of drinking wine.

Sultan Mahmud, modelling the Samanid Bukhara as a cultural center, made Ghazni into a center of learning, inviting Ferdowsi and al-Biruni. He even attempted to persuade Avicenna, but was refused. Mahmud preferred that his fame and glory be publicized in Persian and hundreds of poets assembled at his court. He brought whole libraries from Rayy and Isfahan to Ghazni and even demanded that the Khwarizmshah court send its men of learning to Ghazni. Due to his invasion of Rayy and Isfahan, Persian literary production was inaugurated in Azerbaijan and Iraq.

The Ghaznavids continued to develop historical writing in Persian that had been initiated by their predecessors, the Samanid Empire. The historian Abu'l-Fadl Bayhaqi's Tarikh-e Beyhaqi, written in the latter half of the 11th century, is an example.

Although the Ghaznavids were Turkic and their military leaders were generally of the same stock, as a result of the original involvement of Sebuktigin and Mahmud of Ghazni in Samanid affairs and in the Samanid cultural environment, the dynasty became thoroughly Persianized, so that in practice one cannot consider their rule over Iran one of foreign domination. They also copied their administrative system from the Samanids. In terms of cultural championship and the support of Persian poets, they were more Persian than their ethnically-Iranian rivals, the Buyid dynasty, whose support of Arabic letters in preference to Persian is well known.

The 16th century Persian historian, Firishta, records Sabuktigin's genealogy as descended from the Sasanian kings: "Subooktu-geen, the son of Jookan, the son of Kuzil-Hukum, the son of Kuzil-Arslan, the son of Ferooz, the son of Yezdijird, king of Persia." However, modern historians believe this was an attempt to connect himself with the history of old Persia. 

Historian Bosworth explains: "In fact with the adoption of Persian administrative and cultural ways the Ghaznavids threw off their original Turkish steppe background and became largely integrated with the Perso-Islamic tradition." As a result, Ghazni developed into a great centre of Arabic learning.

With Sultan Mahmud's invasions of North India, Persian culture was established at Lahore, which later produced the famous poet, Masud Sa'd Salman. Lahore, under Ghaznavid rule in the 11th century, attracted Persian scholars from Khorasan, India and Central Asia and became a major Persian cultural centre. It was also during Mahmud's reign that Ghaznavid coinage began to have bilingual legends consisting of Arabic and Devanagari script. The entire range of Persianate institutions and customs that would come to characterize the political economy of most of India would be implemented by the later Ghaznavids.

The Persian culture established by the Ghaznavids in Ghazna and Eastern Afghanistan survived the Ghurid invasion in the 12th century and endured until the invasion of the Mongols.

Legacy

At its height, the Ghaznavid empire grew to cover large parts of present-day Iran, Turkmenistan and Uzbekistan, all of Afghanistan, Pakistan and large parts of northwest India. The Ghaznavid rulers are generally credited with spreading Islam into the Indian subcontinent. 

In addition to the wealth accumulated through raiding Indian cities, and exacting tribute from Indian rajas, the Ghaznavids also benefited from their position as an intermediary along the trade routes between China and the Mediterranean. 

They were, however, unable to hold power for long and by 1040 the Seljuk Empire had taken over their Persian domains and a century later the Ghurids took over their remaining sub-continental lands.

List of rulers

Family tree of the Ghaznavid sultans

See also

List of battles involving the Ghaznavid Empire
History of Afghanistan
History of Pakistan
List of Sunni Muslim dynasties

Notes

References

Sources

 

 

Further reading
 Bosworth, Clifford Edmund (1963) The Ghaznavids: Their Empire in Afghanistan and Eastern Iran 994–1040 Edinburgh University Press, Edinburgh, 
 Bosworth, Clifford Edmund (1977) The Later Ghaznavids: Splendour and Decay, The Dynasty in Afghanistan and Northern India 1040–1186 Columbia University Press, New York, 

 M. Ismail Marcinkowski (2003) Persian Historiography and Geography: Bertold Spuler on Major Works Produced in Iran, the Caucasus, Central Asia, India and Early Ottoman Turkey'' Pustaka Nasional, Singapore,

External links

 Mahmud of Ghazna Columbia Encyclopedia (Sixth Edition)
 Mahmud Encyclopædia Britannica (Online Edition)
 Ghaznavid Dynasty Encyclopædia Britannica (Online Edition)
 Ghaznavids and Ghurids Encyclopædia Britannica (Online Edition)
 Mahmud Ghaznavi's 17 invasions of India
 The History of India, as Told by Its Own Historians. The Muhammadan Periodby Sir H. M. Elliot; Edited by John Dowson; London Trubner Company 1867–1877 Elliot, Sir H. M., Edited by Dowson, John. The History of India, as Told by Its Own Historians. The Muhammadan Period published by London Trubner Company 1867–1877. (Online Copy: – Online version posted by: The Packard Humanities Institute; Persian Texts in translation)
 Afghan secrets revealed on Google Earth

1187 disestablishments
Dynasties of Afghanistan
Empires and kingdoms of Afghanistan
Medieval Afghanistan
History of Ghazni Province
Ghilman
Sunni dynasties
Empires and kingdoms of India
Empires and kingdoms of Pakistan
Islamic rule in the Indian subcontinent
11th century in India
11th century in Iran
Medieval Khorasan
Empires and kingdoms of Iran